

Films

References

LGBT
Films
1970
1970-related lists
1970